Maximites is a genus of Late Carboniferous ammonoids. Fossils are found in various Late Carboniferous marine strata in North America. Maximites is the sole genus of Maximitidae, one of two families of the Superfamily Pseudohaloritoidea, an important subgroup of the order Goniatitida.

References

 The Paleobiology Database accessed on 10/01/07

Pseudohaloritoidea
Goniatitida genera
Carboniferous cephalopods
Ammonites of North America
Paleozoic life of Nunavut